Francis de Saint-Vidal (16 January 1840 – 18 August 1900) was a 19th-century French sculptor and medalist. He was a pupil of Jean-Baptiste Carpeaux.

Works 
 Bust of Ludwig van Beethoven at Musée des beaux-arts de Bordeaux
 La nuit, marble statue, 1884
It was at the time the subject of a book by Bouniceau-Gesmon and published in Le Monde illustré n° 1656 22 December 1888.
 Bronze statue of Alphonse de Neuville, Place Wagram in Paris, 1889, missing.
 Funerary monument to Alphonse de Neuville at Montmartre Cemetery, 23rd division, 1894. 
 Statue of Jean-Baptiste Carpeaux at Musée de l'Histoire de France (Versailles).
Ain El Fouara Fountain in Sétif (1898)
 Monument in honor of Claude Humbert Piarron de Chamousset (1717–1773), built at the intersection between rue Bonaparte and rue de l'Abbaye in Saint-Germain-des-Prés and inaugurated 3 September 1900 by President Émile Loubet.
 Monument to Hector Berlioz (and in Mainz a work after this monument by Francis de Saint-Vidal).

References

External links 
 Francis de Saint-Vidal on data.bnf.fr
 SAINT-VIDAL Francis, de on Société des amis des monuments parisiens

19th-century French sculptors
French male sculptors
1840 births
Artists from Milan
1900 deaths
19th-century French male artists